Allium cristophii, the Persian onion or star of Persia, is a species of flowering plant in the family Amaryllidaceae, native to Iran, Turkey, and Turkmenistan, though grown as an ornamental bulbous plant in many parts of the world. It may be sold under the synonym of Allium albopilosum.

The flowers are followed by attractive fruiting clusters. The plant has received the Royal Horticultural Society's Award of Garden Merit.

A. cristophii performs best in sun to part shade. It is toxic to cats, dogs, and horses. It prefers sandy, gritty soil with good drainage, and is best suited to USDA hardiness zones 5–8.

References

cristophii
Garden plants of Asia
Flora of temperate Asia
Onions
Plants described in 1884